Michael Napolitano is an American politician who served as mayor of the city of Cranston, Rhode Island, succeeding Stephen Laffey. He defeated Councilman Allan Fung by 79 votes. He is a former Municipal Court Judge of the city, as well as a former instructor at Providence College. He oversaw his own law offices for 25 years before becoming Mayor. 

He graduated from Providence College with a degree in political science and received a Juris Doctor from Suffolk University.

External links
City of Cranston's website
Napolitano's Campaign website

Living people
Mayors of Cranston, Rhode Island
Year of birth missing (living people)
Rhode Island lawyers
Rhode Island Democrats